The American Canadian Tour (ACT) is an independent regional stock car racing series based in the northeastern United States, and Eastern Canada. The current ACT Late Model Tour was founded in 1992 as a cost-cutting, regional touring division that conducts races across New England and Quebec. After starting with a pair of non-point events at Hickory Motor Speedway in North Carolina, the ACT Tour will open its 45th season in April 2023 at New Hampshire Motor Speedway in Loudon, New Hampshire.

History
In 1979, television and radio journalist Ken Squier and his business partner Tom Curley formed the North Tour sanctioned by NASCAR for late-model Sportsman-type cars. With sponsorship from companies like Coors, Molson, Skoal, STP, Valvoline and General Motors, the North Tour visited the short track showplaces of the northeastern United States and Canada: Thunder Road in Vermont, Oxford Plains Speedway in Maine, Stafford Motor Speedway in Stafford Springs, Connecticut, Thompson Speedway in Thompson, Connecticut, Sanair Super Speedway in Saint-Pie, Quebec, Cayuga Speedway in Ontario, and Dover Downs International Speedway in Dover, Delaware. Southern stars Butch Lindley, Bill Dennis, Harry Gant, Tommy Ellis, and L.D. Ottinger were frequent visitors to NASCAR North Tour events, along with national icons Bobby Allison, Buddy Baker and Dale Earnhardt.

As a means of transitioning toward a more modern type of race car, Curley formed the independent American-Canadian Tour in 1986, making a total changeover from the NASCAR Late Model Sportsman to the Super Late Model and Pro Stock cars used throughout the country. In 1987, Curley’s ACT aligned with Rex Robbins’ American Speed Association (ASA) of the Midwest and Bob Harmon’s All-Pro Series of the southeast, forming the Stock Car Connection. The SCC visited high-profile tracks in Cincinnati, OH; Milwaukee, WI; Nazareth, PA; and Nashville, TN; and saw visitors that included Darrell Waltrip, Mark Martin, Bobby and Davey Allison, and Rusty and Kenny Wallace, along with short track legends Dick Trickle, Butch Miller, Mike Eddy, Bob Senneker, Steve Grissom, and Bobby Gill.  

With General Motors stepping up its commitment to ACT in 1989, the GM Motorsport National Stock Car Series was formed in Canada, offering large purses, even larger point funds, and coast-to-coast television coverage. Budweiser created the Bud Triple Crown as part of the GM Series, and paid Ontario’s Junior Hanley over $50,000 in 1991 and again in ’92 for sweeping the series. During Hanley’s ACT Championship years from 1991-93, the legendary Ontario driver earned more than $700,000 in winnings! 

The current American-Canadian Tour Late Models utilize a modern, cost-effective program that creates thrilling side-by-side action and has built one of the leading short track series in North America. Beginning in 1992 and taking center stage in 1996, the Late Models have introduced many innovative concepts used in several disciplines of short track racing. 

ACT developed one of the first “spec” engine programs in 1999 as a cost-saving option for local and regional racers. After successful testing in the early 2000s, most teams, tracks and promoters both regionally and nationally have made the switch. The “spec” engine program expanded to include a Ford option in 2010 and added the popular GM ‘602’ in 2018. A similar cost-saving “spec” program exists with Koni and QA1 shock absorbers as well as a uniform Hoosier Racing Tire utilized by the Tour and its partner tracks and series.

Modern Day

For their efforts in the growth of stock car racing, both Squier and Curley have been inducted into the New England Auto Racing Hall of Fame and the Vermont Sports Hall of Fame. In 2004, ACT founder Tom Curley was voted by more than 1,000 race promoters across the continent as the Auto Racing Promoter of the Year. In 2018 Ken Squier was ceremoniously inducted into the NASCAR Hall of Fame in Charlotte, NC for his contributions to the growth of the sport on a national, and international, level.  

While Squier continues to visit Thunder Road, ACT lost its visionary leader in May of 2017 when a decades-long battle with COPD claimed Tom Curley. In November that year the American-Canadian Tour changed ownership for the first time in its storied history. Former racer Cris Michaud and Vermont businessman Pat Malone took charge of the sanctioning body after partnering to purchase Vermont’s Thunder Road earlier that season. The partnership would go on to purchase New Hampshire’s White Mountain Motorsports Park in 2019. 

In recent years the American-Canadian Tour has competed at tracks across New England, Quebec, Virginia, North Carolina and Florida. Partnering with the Maine-based Pro All Stars Series (PASS), the two sanctioning bodies have been co-promoting events at Thompson Speedway Motorsports Park (CT) since 2020.  

Competitors, officials, and fans alike are eagerly awaiting the 2023 season to begin. In its 45th consecutive year, the American-Canadian Tour schedule features thirteen point-counting events in New England and Quebec with highlights that include the return to Stafford Speedway, at least seven events worth $5,000-or-more to win and joining the region’s biggest weekends, including the 51st Spring Sizzler, the 50th Oxford 250 and the 61st Vermont Milk Bowl.  

The American-Canadian Tour also returns as a permanent fixture in Quebec, Canada with the 10-race Serie ACT Quebec series in 2023. ACT-sanctioned weekly racing can also be found at Thunder Road International Speedbowl (VT), White Mountain Motorsports Park (NH) and Thompson Speedway (CT).

American-Canadian Tour Champions (1979-2022)

Série ACT Quebec
After a five year hiatus, partially due to the COVID-19 pandemic and subsequent international border closure, the Serie ACT Quebec series returns in 2023 for a 10-race schedule. Split evenly between Quebec bullrings Autodrome Chaudiere and Autodrome Montmagny, Serie ACT Quebec brings a permanent presence back to Canada for the ACT sanctioning body.

See also
Pro All Star Series
NASCAR
K&N Pro Series East
CASCAR Super Series
NASCAR Canadian Tire Series
List of NASCAR series

References

External links
 American Canadian Tour official website
 The Third Turn Database

Auto racing series in Canada
Motorsport in Canada
Stock car racing series in the United States